Robert Laurie (c. 1755–1836) was an Anglo-Scottish mezzotint engraver and publisher. He signed his name as Lowery, Lowry, Lowrie, Lawrey, Lawrie, or Laurie.

Early years
Born about 1755, his background was the Lauries of Maxwelton, Dumfriesshire. He received from the Society of Arts in 1770 a silver palette for a drawing from a picture, and in 1773, 1775, and 1776 premiums for designs of patterns for calico-printing.

Work

His earliest portraits in mezzotint are dated 1771. He was a relatively early British user of the à la poupée method of printing in colours, extending the number of colours considerably, and for this received from the Society of Arts in 1776 a bounty of thirty guineas. Early in 1794, in partnership with James Whittle, he succeeded to the business carried on by Robert Sayer at the Golden Buck in Fleet Street, London as a publisher of engravings, maps, charts, and nautical works. Major charts published by this firm were James Cook's Survey of the South Coast of Newfoundland (1776) and the Surveys of St. George's Channel, (1777). Laurie then gave up the practice of engraving. He retired from business in 1812, and the firm continued as Whittle & Laurie, but the business was run by his son, Richard Holmes Laurie, who, on the death of Whittle in 1818, became the sole proprietor. L. S. De la Rochette and John Purdy were the hydrographers to the firm.

Death
Robert Laurie died at Broxbourne, Hertfordshire, on 19 May 1836, aged 81. His son died at 53 Fleet Street, on 19 January 1858, also at the age of 81, leaving two daughters.

Works

Major subject prints by Laurie were:

The Adoration of the Magi, The Return from Egypt, The Crucifixion, and St. John the Evangelist, after Rubens
The Crucifixion, after Vandyck
The Incredulity of St. Thomas, after Rembrandt
The Holy Family, after Guercino
Christ crucified, after Annibale Carracci
The Adoration of the Magi, after Andrea Casali
The Quack Doctor, after Christian Wilhelm Ernst Dietrich
The Flemish Rat-catcher and The Itinerant Singer, after Adriaen van Ostade
The Wrath of Achilles, after Antoine Coypel
A Hard Gale and A Squall, after Joseph Vernet
The Oath of Calypso, Diana and her Nymphs bathing, and a Madonna, after Angelica Kauffman
Sunrise: landscape with fishermen, after George Barret
The Naval Victory of Lord Rodney, after Robert Dodd
Young Lady confessing to a Monk, after William Millar
Court of Equity, or Convivial City Meeting, after Robert Dighton
The Rival Milliners and The Jealous Maids, after John Collet
The Full of the Honeymoon and The Wane of the Honeymoon, after Francis Wheatley
a scene from She Stoops to Conquer, with portraits of Shuter, Quick, and Mrs. Green, after Thomas Parkinson
a scene from The School for Scandal, with portraits of Mrs. Abington, King, Smith, and Palmer, from a drawing by himself.

Portraits include those of:

George III and Queen Charlotte, after Zoffany 
Queen Charlotte, with the Princess Royal and Princess Sophia Augusta, and George, prince of Wales, with Frederick, duke of York, two groups after his own designs
David Garrick, after Sir Joshua ReynoldsGarrick led off the Stage by Time towards the Temple of Fame'', after Thomas Parkinson
Garrick with Mrs. Bellamy, as Romeo and Juliet, after Benjamin Wilson
Mrs. Baddeley, the actress, after Zoffany;
Elizabeth Gunning, duchess of Argyll, two plates after Catharine Read
Jemima, countess Cornwallis, after Sir Joshua Reynolds
Richard Howe, 1st Earl Howe, after Peter Mequignon
John Jervis, 1st Earl of St Vincent;
Étienne François, duc de Choiseul, full-length, after Jean-Baptiste van Loo;
Georgiana, Duchess of Devonshire
Joseph Ames

and a series of twelve portraits of actors, after Robert Dighton.

Notes

References
 
 
Attribution

External links

1755 births
1836 deaths
British engravers
19th-century publishers (people)